Drametse Gewog (Dzongkha: དགྲ་མེད་རྩེ་) is a gewog (village block) of Mongar District, Bhutan.

References

Gewogs of Bhutan
Mongar District